Secret City is an Australian political thriller television series based on the best-selling novels The Marmalade Files, The Mandarin Code, and The Shadow Game by Chris Uhlmann and Steve Lewis. It premiered on Foxtel's Showcase on 5 June 2016 and on Netflix internationally on 26 June 2018. The series is produced by Matchbox Pictures and Foxtel.

A sequel to the series called Secret City: Under the Eagle was green-lit in February 2018. It aired on 4 March 2019 in Australia and launched worldwide on Netflix on 6 March 2019. It is unknown if there will be a season 3.

The sequel storyline is a departure from the books written by Uhlmann and Lewis, who joined the series as story consultants.

Synopsis

Secret City

Beneath the placid facade of Canberra, amidst rising tension between China and the United States, Canberra press gallery journalist Harriet Dunkley (Anna Torv) forces her way closer to the truth, uncovering a set of interlocked conspiracies which threaten her career and her life and endanger the freedom of every Australian.

Secret City: Under the Eagle

The story picks up with Harriet unwittingly ensnared in a military and political cover-up with Catriona Bailey's (Jacki Weaver) fingerprints all over it. Harriet's search for the truth leads her back into Canberra's corridors of power, this time working for a maverick Independent MP. What she unearths is a military program so secret even the Prime Minister knows nothing of its existence.

Cast

Recurring cast 
 Anna Torv as Harriet Dunkley, a former investigative journalist for The Daily Nation, now Senior Media Advisor to Karen Koutoufides
 Jacki Weaver as Catriona Bailey, Attorney-General and Minister for Justice, later Minister for Home Affairs
 Marcus Graham as Andrew "Griff" Griffiths, Chief of Staff to the Minister of Home Affairs, former Senior Political Correspondent for The Daily Nation
 Sacha Horler as Ludie Sypek, host of a SKY political panel show, former Chief of Staff to previous Prime Minister Martin Toohey
 Justin Smith as William Vaughn, Director-General of the Australian Signals Directorate
 Aleks Mikic as Thomas Maher, a junior analyst in the Australian Signals Directorate

Secret City 
 Daniel Wyllie as Malcolm Paxton, Minister for Defence
 Alex Dimitriades as Charles Dancer, Australian Security Intelligence Organisation (ASIO) officer 
 Damon Herriman as Kim Gordon, a senior analyst in the Australian Signals Directorate
 Alan Dale as Martin Toohey, Australian Prime Minister
 Mekhi Phifer as Brent Moreton, US Ambassador to Australia
 Eugenia Yuan as Weng Meigui, wife of the Chinese Ambassador
 Matt Zeremes as Sean Brimmer, Senior Constable, Australian Federal Police
 Huw Higginson as Gus Reardon, Editor of The Daily Nation
 Miranda Tapsell as Sasha Rose, a cadet journalist at The Daily Nation
 Brenna Harding as Cassie, Australian National University student
 Benedict Samuel as Felix Crawford, lecturer and tutor at Australian National University
Sean Taylor as Paul Wheeler, Director-General of the Australian Security Intelligence Organisation
 Kate Mulvany as Veronica "Ronnie" Bordoni, Chief of Staff to the Minister of Defence
 David Roberts as General Ross McAuliffe, Chief of the Defence Force
 Anni Finsterer as Vice Admiral Joanna Hartzig, Vice Chief of the Defence Force
 Max Brown as Kevin Dang, boyfriend of Cassie and Australian National University student
 Charles Wu as Qiu, Australian National University student
 Kimie Tsukakoshi as Ivy Chen

Secret City: Under the Eagle 
 Danielle Cormack as Karen Koutoufides, Independent MP for Wakefield, South Australia 
 Laura Gordon as Caroline "Cal" Treloar, Drone Pilot, Royal Australian Air Force
 Rob Collins as Lieutenant Joseph Sullivan 
 Don Hany as Ewan Garrity, Australian Prime Minister
 Andrew McFarlane as Air Chief Marshal Wes Lockwood, Chief of the Defence Force
 Joel Tobeck as Jim Hellier, Minister for Defence, later Acting Minister for Home Affairs
 Louisa Mignone as Mina Al Masi, friend and former cellmate of Harriet Dunkley
 Robert Rabiah as Sami Al Masi, Canberra businessman and husband of Mina
 Tom Wren as Alex Berezin, a lobbyist for Vanguard Energy 
 Renee Lim as Major Helen Wu, Australian Army and wife of William Vaughn
 Benedict Hardie as Declan Boyd, assistant to Karen Koutoufides 
 Michael Denkha as Michael Lavelle, CEO of South East Asia Operations for Trebuchet 
 Di Adams as Gaelene Curtis, Liberal Party Leader of the Opposition and MP from Victoria
 Christopher Kirby  as Kip Buchanan, US Ambassador to Australia
 Frederick Du Rietz as Robbie Lambert, lone survivor of the Davoren Park explosion
 Dalip Sondhi as Yasir Younis, Pakistan Ambassador to Australia
 Rhondda Findleton as Madeline Stenders, Director-General of the Australian Security Intelligence Organisation
 Rob MacPherson as Richard Gascoigne, United States Secretary of Defence
 Greg Eccleston as Floor Manager 1, crew member on Sky News Australia show "Inside World"
 Fiona Press as Sylvie Dunkley, mother of Harriet Dunkley

Series overview

Episodes

Secret City (2016)

Secret City: Under the Eagle (2019)
All episodes were released on stream platform Foxtel on 4 March 2019.

Reception

Awards and nominations

References

External links
 

Showcase (Australian TV channel) original programming
2010s Australian drama television series
Television shows set in Australian Capital Territory
Australian LGBT-related television shows
2016 Australian television series debuts
Australian political drama television series
Transgender-related television shows
Television series by Matchbox Pictures
Television shows based on Australian novels